Isonoe may refer to:

 Isonoe, a lover of Zeus in Greek mythology
 Isonoe (moon), a moon of Jupiter